The Airbus A310 is a 1982 medium- to long-range widebody airliner created by Airbus Industrie.

A310 may also refer to:

 A310 road (Great Britain), a road connecting Kingston upon Thames to Brentford 
 Acorn Archimedes A310, a British home computer
 Alpine A310, a 1971 French sports car